John Derek Williams Tomlinson (26 March 1926 – 1 April 2010) was an English cricketer who played first-class cricket for Derbyshire County Cricket Club in 1946.

Tomlinson was born in South Normanton. He played several games for Derbyshire Club and Ground and the Derbyshire second XI before his first-class debut for Derbyshire in the 1946 season. His only first-class match was against Somerset in August 1946.  He continued playing occasionally for the Club and Ground and Second XI in 1947 and 1948.

Tomlinson was a right-handed batsman, and made two runs in his single first-class innings.

Tomlinson died aged 84 at St. John's, Newfoundland and Labrador

References

External links
 Dr. J. D. W. Tomlinson biographical sketch, first professor of anatomy at the Faculty of Medicine, Memorial University of Newfoundland.

1926 births
English cricketers
2010 deaths
Derbyshire cricketers
People from South Normanton
Cricketers from Derbyshire